The Women's 100 metre breaststroke SB6 event at the 2022 Commonwealth Games was held on 1 August at the Sandwell Aquatics Centre.

Schedule
The schedule was as follows:

All times are British Summer Time (UTC+1)

Results

Final

References

Women's 100 metre breaststroke SB6
Common